Nokia E90 Communicator was a high-end 3G smartphone from Nokia, the fifth generation Communicator, and also part of the Eseries. It was announced on 11 February 2007 at the 3GSM show in Barcelona. It succeeded the Nokia 9500 Communicator as the company's flagship business-oriented device. Its clamshell form and design are reminiscent of older palmtop computers.

Unlike its predecessors, the E90 runs on the S60 platform of Symbian OS (3rd Edition Feature Pack 1 and v9.2 respectively). Previous Communicators meanwhile have been based on either GeOS or Symbian-based Series 80. The move to the common S60 was good for software compatibility, but it did get rid of some exclusive Series 80 UI behaviours. The E90 is also the first Communicator to have UMTS/HSDPA connectivity and integrated GPS. It features OSGi and eRCP, Eclipse RCP for embedded systems.

The first Nokia E90 unit was sold in an auction in Jakarta, Indonesia on 17 May 2007 for Rp. 45,000,000 (5,000 US$). Indonesia being one of the largest market share for Nokia's communicator series is cited as a reason for the unit's first launch location.

Early user-feedback and reviews highlighted a defect in the microphone of the Communicator. Nokia initially denied the existence of the defect, but Nokia Europe later acknowledged it in the Q3 earnings report released on 18 October 2007, and stated that the issue had been fully resolved.

The replacement of the QWERTY-ridden interface of Series 80 with the S60 software, which is designed to be used with one thumb, was criticised by some people.

The Communicator's firmware version 7.40.1.2, released in late October 2007, added support for A-GPS and improved GPS performance. This version also upgraded the Maps application. , the Communicator's most recent firmware version is 400.34.93. The free navigation program Ovi Maps is also available for this Communicator (currently just without the free navigation itself).

Specification sheet
(Source )

 The Nokia E90 does not support fax as fax services are not included in the 3G Specifications. It does however support fax through Content Beamer application. 
 Supports Microsoft Exchange email via the Nokia "Mail for Exchange" software application.  This program does not support folders or native HTML mail.

References

External links

 Official Nokia E90 page
 Forum Nokia Specifications
 Nokia Press Release – 12 February 2007.
 Latest Nokia Maps application and Map Loader utility
 Beta release of contact-threaded SMS/MMS text messaging application for E90 – and others

Mobile phones with an integrated hardware keyboard
S60 (software platform)
Nokia ESeries
Mobile phones with infrared transmitter
Mobile phones with user-replaceable battery
Flip phones